The 2013 Central Oklahoma football team represented the University of Central Oklahoma during the 2013 NCAA Division II football season, and the 108th season of Broncho football.  The Bronchos played their five home games at Wantland Stadium in Edmond, Oklahoma, which had been Central Oklahoma's home stadium since 1965. The 2013 team was coming off a 2-8 record in 2012. The 2013 team was headed by second year head coach Nick Bobeck. 2013 was the Bronchos 2nd as a member of the Mid-America Intercollegiate Athletics Association (MIAA).

Preseason outlook
The Central Oklahoma Bronchos began the season expected to finish near the bottom of the MIAA; 11th in the media poll and 10th in the coaches poll.

Media
Every Central Oklahoma game will be broadcast on KZLS AM 1640 and KNAH 99.7 F.M.

Schedule

Coaching staff
Central Oklahoma head coach Nick Bobeck is in his second year as the Bronchos’ head coach for the 2013 season. During his previous year with Central Oklahoma, he led the Bronchos to a record of 2 wins and 8 losses (2–8).

Roster

Game summaries

Missouri Southern State

This was the second ever meeting of the Lions and Bronchos. The Lions began the game with a 14-0 lead with only five minutes left in the first quarter. Lions quarterback Jay McDowell was 10 for 11 for 232 yards and ran for an additional 121 yards and 2 TDs. Broncho running Back Joshua Birmingham ran for 169 yards and 4 TDs. But the Lions large lead to begin the game proved too much for UCO to overcome. The Bronchos fell in their season opener for the sixth year in a row.

Pittsburg State

Emporia State

Washburn

Missouri Western State

Northwest Missouri State

Central Missouri

Lincoln

Southwest Baptist

Northeastern State

Rankings

Statistics

Team

Scores by quarter

References

Central Oklahoma
Central Oklahoma Bronchos football seasons
Central Oklahoma Bronchos football